El Laberinto de Alicia (Alicia's Labyrinth) is a Colombian telenovela produced and broadcast by RCN Televisión, based on the Chilean telenovela of the same name. It stars Marcela Carvajal, Patrick Delmas and Juan Pablo Shuk, with the participations of Patricia Castañeda, Juliana Galvis, Consuelo Luzardo and Ricardo Vélez.

Cast 
 Marcela Carvajal as Alicia Vega
 Patrick Delmas as Manuel Pascual
 Juan Pablo Shuk as Rafael Villegas
 César Mora as Ramón Garmendia
 Patricia Castañeda as Sofía Villegas
 Juliana Galvis as Silvia Vega
 Joavany Álvarez as Efraín León
 Ricardo Vélez as Francisco Borda
 Carlos Mariño as Gregorio de La Fuente
 Consuelo Luzardo as Helena de La Fuente
 Marco Antonio López S. as Hernán Cano
 Manuel Prieto as Emilio Borda Villegas
 Cristina García as Daniela Villegas
 Guillermo Blanco as Santiago León
 Mariana Garzón as Carolina Berrío
 Isabella García as Valentina Borda Villegas
 Maríana Hernandez Doncel as Antonia Pascual Vega
 Juan Pablo Manzanera as Mateo León Vega
 Marianela Quintero as Karen Moncada
 Astrid Hernández as Ana María Franco
 Yesenia Valencia as Diana Anzola
 Kiño as Gumersindo Santos
 Jaime Santos as Álvaro de la Fuente
 Maia Landaburu as Victoria Berrío
 Carlos Betancur Chow as Guardia 2 - Cárcel Garmendia

Versions 
 El Laberinto de Alicia (2011), produced by TVN, starring Sigrid Alegría, Francisco Reyes and Marcelo Alonso, with the participations of Mauricio Pesutic and Amparo Noguera.

References

External links 
  

2014 telenovelas
Colombian telenovelas
Spanish-language telenovelas
RCN Televisión telenovelas
2014 Colombian television series debuts
2015 Colombian television series endings
Television shows set in Bogotá